The sixteenth series of Geordie Shore, a British television programme based in Newcastle Upon Tyne was filmed in September 2017 and began on 9 January 2018, and concluded after ten episodes on 13 March 2018. This is the first series not to include original cast member Gaz Beadle after he quit the show for personal reasons. New cast members for this series include Sam Gowland, who had previously appeared on the third series of Love Island, as well as Steph Snowdon. However it was later revealed that Steph had been axed from the show and would therefore not return for the seventeenth series.

During this series, cast members Aaron Chalmers and Marnie Simpson both announced that they'd quit the show – therefore this was their final series. The series focused heavily on the love triangle between Abbie, Chloe and Sam, before Chloe and Sam finally make their relationship official. It also included former flames Aaron and Marnie coming to terms with living in the house together whilst both in relationships outside of the house, as well as Sophie and Nathan's struggles without their other halves.

Cast 
Aaron Chalmers
Chloe Ferry
Sam Gowland
Nathan Henry
Abbie Holborn
Sophie Kasaei
Marnie Simpson
Steph Snowdon

Duration of cast 

 = Cast member is featured in this episode.
 = Cast member arrives in the house.
 = Cast member voluntarily leaves the house.
 = Cast member is removed from the house.
 = Cast member returns to the house.
 = Cast member leaves the series.
 = Cast member does not feature in this episode.

Episodes

Ratings

References

Series 16
2018 British television seasons